BSV Schwarz-Weiß Rehden is a German sports club based in the municipality of Rehden, Lower Saxony.  The club's football division currently plays in the fourth-tier Regionalliga Nord.

History
The club was founded in 1954. After spending its early history in the local amateur leagues, the club was promoted to the fifth-tier Niedersachsenliga in 2001. Rehden then qualified for the 2003–04 DFB-Pokal, where they were eliminated by TSV 1860 München in the first round.

In 2011–12 Rehden won promotion to the Regionalliga Nord for the first time in their history, by finishing fourth in the Oberliga Niedersachsen.

In the 2013–14 DFB-Pokal, Rehden took on Bayern Munich in the first round. Rehden lost the match 5–0.

Current squad

Stadium

The club's home ground, Sportplatz Waldsportstätten, holds 4,350 spectators, 350 of those seated.

Honours
 Lower Saxony Cup
 Winners: 2014, 2022

Notable managers
 Marek Leśniak

References

External links
 Official website 

Football clubs in Germany
Football clubs in Lower Saxony
Association football clubs established in 1954
1954 establishments in West Germany